The Jovel Music Hall is a 1,500-seat concert venue located in Münster, Germany. Notable past performers include Motörhead, Duran Duran and Blue Öyster Cult. The Jovel Music Hall opened in 1979.

References

External links
Official Website

Music venues in Germany
Culture in Münster